Hypostomus mutucae is a species of catfish in the family Loricariidae. It is native to South America, where it occurs in the Cuiabá River basin in Brazil. The species reaches 10.9 cm (4.3 inches) SL.

H. mutucae occasionally appears in the aquarium trade, where it is typically referred to either as the Mutuca pleco or by its associated L-number, which is LDA-010.

References 

mutucae
Fish described in 1999